The Timișoara–Moravița Motorway is a proposed motorway in the south-western part of Romania, labelled as A9. It will connect the city of Timișoara to the border with Serbia. Feasibility studies for the whole motorway are currently ongoing. It is planned to be approximatively 70 km long.

Route
The motorway begins east of Timișoara at the junction with the A1 motorway near Remetea Mare. It will bypass the largest city of the historical region of Banat in east. South of Timișoara, near Giroc, there will be a connecting road to the Timișoara ring bypass. From here, the motorway will head south towards Jebel, Opatiţa and Stamora Germană, east of the DN59, before reaching the border with Serbia near Moravița.

In Serbia, the motorway is planned to head towards the capital of Belgrade via Vršac, where it'd connect to the rest of the Serbian motorway network, thus providing a high-speed connection from Romania to Montenegro and other former Yugoslav countries, but could also work as an alternative route between Romania and Western Europe via Serbia and Croatia, rather than Hungary.

See also
Roads in Romania
Transport in Romania

References
Inline

Further reading
http://www.opiniatimisoarei.ro/sa-obtina-bani-europeni-pentru-centura-si-autostrada-timisoara-belgrad-cui-ii-face-nicolae-robu-acest-indemn/02/02/2016
http://monitorizari.hotnews.ro/stiri-infrastructura_articole-21407697-dacian-ciolos-lansam-studiu-fezabilitate-pentru-vedea-daca-justifica-autostrada-timisoara-spre-belgrad.htm
http://adevarul.ro/locale/timisoara/s-a-deblocat-proiectul-autostrazii-timisoara-moravita-studiul-fezabilitate-intra-finantare-actualul-exercitiu-bugetar-10-milioane-euro-1_58cd3bbb5ab6550cb8738153/index.html

Proposed roads in Romania
Motorways in Romania